The 1997 Stanley Cup Finals was the championship series of the National Hockey League's (NHL) 1996–97 season, and the culmination of the 1997 Stanley Cup playoffs. It was contested by the Detroit Red Wings and the Philadelphia Flyers. Detroit won the series in four games to win the Stanley Cup for the eighth time in franchise history and the first time since ; Philadelphia had not won since . Detroit was the last team to win the Cup without having home ice advantage in the Finals and with fewer than 100 points earned during the regular season until .

Paths to the Finals

Philadelphia rose to the top on the back of a 17-game unbeaten streak in December and January, and despite losing the Atlantic Division title to New Jersey, had a relatively easy time with the Pittsburgh Penguins and Buffalo Sabres in the first two rounds. The Flyers arrived into the Stanley Cup Finals having beaten their perennial rivals, the New York Rangers, in a memorable five-game Eastern Conference Final series. Eric Lindros and Wayne Gretzky each recorded a hat trick in the set, but the size, strength and discipline of Philadelphia (particularly the Legion of Doom line) trumped the veteran savvy of the Blueshirts.

For Detroit there was the departure of several players whom head coach Scotty Bowman blamed for their loss to Colorado a year prior, including trading away Paul Coffey to get star Brendan Shanahan. Detroit won 38 games in the regular season, in contrast to the record-setting 62 win season the previous year, making them the dark horse in the Western Conference as the third seed behind the Dallas Stars and Colorado Avalanche. In the playoffs, the Wings dispatched a fractured St. Louis Blues team and a surprising rival Mighty Ducks of Anaheim to reach the Western Conference finals for the third straight season. In a rematch of last year's conference finals where Colorado had upset Detroit, this time Detroit overcame defending Cup holders Colorado in an often brutal six-game series to earn second trip to the Stanley Cup Finals in three years.

This is the first time that these two teams met in the postseason.

Game summaries

Game one

Game one in Philadelphia took place exactly ten years to the day after the Flyers' emotional seventh-game loss to the Edmonton Oilers in the  Finals. Detroit never trailed in the game: they led 2–1 after the first period, 3–2 after the second, and Steve Yzerman scored the fourth goal 56 seconds into the third period. Sergei Fedorov scored the winner and was named the game's first star.

Game two

Brendan Shanahan scored an unassisted goal 1:37 into the game and Steve Yzerman scored a power-play goal at 9:22 of the first period to give the Red Wings a 2–0 lead before Rod Brind'Amour scored a pair of power-play goals late in the first period to tie the score. In the second, Kirk Maltby scored the game-winning goal at 2:39 and Shanahan scored his second goal of the game at 9:56 of the third and the Red Wings won a second consecutive 4–2 victory and a 2–0 series lead heading back to Joe Louis Arena.

Game three

John LeClair scored at 7:03 of the first period to give the Flyers their first lead of the series. Two minutes later, Yzerman scored on the power-play to tie the score. Fedorov scored two minutes later to put Detroit ahead for good in the game. Martin Lapointe scored later in the first to give the Wings a 3–1 advantage. The Wings tacked on two more in the second and added one in the third for a decisive 6–1 win and a three-games-to-none series advantage. For his four-point night, Fedorov was named the game's first star.

In his post-game comments, Flyers head coach Terry Murray was quoted as saying the team was "basically in a choking situation," which many observers interpreted as Murray having called out his own players as chokers. The manner in which they played compounded by the insurmountable series deficit along with the Wings' seeming dominance in stretches of the first two games as well as most of game three lent credence to the claim.

Game four

The Red Wings controlled the game from the get-go, forging ahead 1–0 after one period and employing the left-wing lock to keep the Flyers' mix of big and speedy forwards at bay. Darren McCarty's second-period tally effectively sealed the deal. The burly checker faked out Flyers rookie defenceman Janne Niinimaa inside the blue line, swooped around him, then did a quick cutback in front of Hextall in his crease to slip the puck into the net. Eric Lindros would score his lone goal of the series with 15 seconds to play. The 2–1 win brought Detroit its eighth Stanley Cup, and its first in 42 seasons.

Sergei Fedorov led the Wings in playoff scoring with 20 points. Detroit goaltender Mike Vernon, who had been in net for the whole of the Wings' failed 1995 playoff run, and relegated to the bench the year before, earned vindication and his first Conn Smythe Trophy as playoff MVP by holding Philadelphia to six goals in four games.

Team rosters
Bolded years under Finals appearance indicates year won Stanley Cup.

Detroit Red Wings

Philadelphia Flyers

Stanley Cup engraving
The 1997 Stanley Cup was presented to Red Wings captain Steve Yzerman by NHL Commissioner Gary Bettman following the Red Wings 2–1 win over the Flyers in game four

The following Red Wings players and staff had their names engraved on the Stanley Cup

1996–97 Detroit Red Wings

 Hodson played only six games (dressed for 23 games), but name was included on the Stanley Cup, because he spent majority of the season with Detroit.
Included on the team picture, but left off the Stanley Cup
 #22 Mike Knuble† – played nine regular season games, did not qualify to be engraved on the Stanley Cup. He was left off for playing 68 games in the minors for Adirondack.
Johnny Remejes† (Dressing Room Asst.), Mike Vella† (Dressing Room Asst). Each of the three members and many other members not listed were awarded Stanley Cup rings.

Broadcasting
In Canada, the series was televised on CBC. In the United States, Fox broadcast game one while ESPN televised games two through four. Had the series extended, games five and seven would have been broadcast on Fox, and ESPN would have aired game six.

Aftermath
On June 13, 1997, just six days after the Red Wings won the Stanley Cup, a limousine carrying Vladimir Konstantinov, team masseur Sergei Mnatsakanov and Viacheslav Fetisov crashed into a tree after returning from a private party. Konstantinov spent several weeks in a coma and suffered from serious head injuries and paralysis. Fetisov, on the other hand, sustained minor injuries and Mnatsakanov suffered heavy head injuries and a coma. Fetisov continued to play, but Konstantinov did not, as the crash ended his career. The Red Wings successfully returned to the Finals the following year. This time, the Red Wings played the Washington Capitals and swept them 4–0 to capture their second consecutive Stanley Cup championship. During the celebration ceremonies after winning the Stanley Cup, Konstantinov was wheeled around the ice with his teammates in his wheelchair with the Cup on his lap.

See also
 1996–97 NHL season

References

 
 
 Sports Illustrated Article

 
Detroit Red Wings games
Philadelphia Flyers games
Stanley Cup Finals
Stan
May 1997 sports events in the United States
June 1997 sports events in the United States
Ice hockey competitions in Philadelphia
Ice hockey competitions in Detroit
1997 in Detroit
1990s in Philadelphia
1997 in sports in Illinois
1997 in sports in Pennsylvania